The 2008–09 Mid-American Conference season is a National Collegiate Athletic Association Division I conference. The Mid-American Conference (MAC) sponsors 23 sports (11 men's and 12 women's).  The MAC is made up of 12 full-time members and five affiliate members.

The 2008–09 season is the 63rd season in existence.

Member schools
There are twelve schools with full membership:

Five schools have affiliate membership status:

Reese and Jacoby trophies
The Reese and Jacoby trophies are awarded to the top men's and women's athletic departments in the Mid-American Conference.

Points are awarded based on each school's finish, with the overall total divided by the number of sports sponsored by each school. An institution may count either indoor track and field or outdoor track and field but not both.

Reese standings

* Affiliate status only.  Does not qualify for trophy.

Jacoby standings

* Affiliate status only. Does not qualify for trophy.

Sports

Basketball (men's)

Tournament

Players of the week
The following are the MAC men's basketball players of the week.  Number of awards won this season are in parenthesis.

Basketball (women's)

Standings
Through March 8, 2009

East

West

* Receives E3 seed based on 2–0 head-to-head record vs. Miami.

Tournament

Cross country (men's)
Eastern Michigan won its fourth consecutive MAC Championship in 2008.  The All-MAC team consisted of Ryan Bloom (Buffalo), Josh Karanja (Eastern Michigan), Sammy Kiprotch (Central Michigan), Aiman Scullion (Kent State), Kevin Silver (Miami), Pat Sovacool (Miami) and Curtis Vollmar (Eastern Michigan).

Sovacool of Miami was the only runner to qualify for the NCAA Championship.  He finished 65th overall.

In the preseason poll voted by the MAC head coaches, Eastern Michigan was chosen to win the 2008 men's MAC Cross Country Championship.  EMU had won the past three MAC Championships and had five All-MAC runners returning.

MAC Championship results
 Eastern Michigan, 42 points
 Miami, 56
 Kent State, 61
 Central Michigan, 103
 Ohio, 122
 Buffalo, 169
 Akron, 179
 Toledo, 186
 Bowling Green, 270

Players of the week

Cross country (women's)

MAC Championship results
 Miami, 39 points
 Akron, 81
 Ohio, 107
 Central Michigan, 141
 Bowling Green, 147
 Toledo, 165
 Buffalo, 177
 Kent State, 184
 Western Michigan, 218
 Eastern Michigan, 238
 Ball State, 251
 NIU, 355

Players of the week

Field hockey

Standings

Football

Ball State started the 2008 football season 12–0, going undefeated in conference play and defeating Indiana and Navy in out of conference games.  BSU was ranked as high as 12th in the Associated Press Poll and 13th in the Coaches' Poll.  They were also ranked 12th at one point in the Bowl Championship Series (BCS) rankings.  However, Ball State was upset by Buffalo in the MAC Championship game, lost their bowl game vs. Tulsa and finished unranked in each of the polls.

In regular season non-conference games, the MAC defeated BCS opponents #25 Pittsburgh (Bowling Green won 27–17), Syracuse (Akron won 42–28), Indiana (Ball State won 42–20 and Central Michigan won 37–34), Illinois (Western Michigan won 23–17) and Michigan (Toledo won 13–10).

Despite having a successful non-conference record and gaining five bowl bids, the MAC finished the bowl season poorly.  The MAC was the only conference to not win a bowl game and finished 0–5.

Golf (women's)

MAC Championship
1. Kent State (1217)
2. Eastern Michigan (1256)
3. Akron (1297)
3. Western Michigan (1297)
5. Toledo (1305)
6. Ball State (1313)
7. Ohio (1318)
8. NIU (1366)
9. Bowling Green (1401)

Soccer (men's)

Standings

Soccer (women's)

Standings

Swimming (men's)

Standings

MAC Championship results
 Eastern Michigan, 1046.5 points
 Buffalo, 639.5
 Miami, 588
 Ball State, 267

Swimming (women's)

Standings

MAC Championship results
 Miami, 639½ points
 Ohio, 611½
 Toledo, 568½
 Eastern Michigan, 497½
 Akron, 347  
 Buffalo, 335  
 Bowling Green, 305½
 Ball State, 200½

Track and field (men's)

Indoor MAC Championships
 Kent State, 159 points
 Eastern Michigan, 132
 Akron, 109
 Central Michigan, 64
 Buffalo, 61

Track and field (women's)

Indoor MAC Championships
1. Akron, 126 points
2. Kent State, 101
3. Miami, 73
3. Ball State, 73
5. Western Michigan, 62
6. Buffalo, 52
7. Central Michigan, 44½
8. Ohio, 42½
9. Eastern Michigan, 42
10. Toledo, 35
11. Bowling Green, 11
12. NIU, 1

Volleyball

Tournament bracket

Standings

East

West

Wrestling

Standings

See also
 Mid-American Conference
 List of Mid-American Conference champions

References

External links
 Official website

Mid-American Conference seasons